California's 51st congressional district is a congressional district in the U.S. state of California.
The district currently includes central and eastern portions of San Diego, as well as eastern suburbs such as El Cajon, La Mesa, Spring Valley, and Lemon Grove.

Competitiveness

In statewide races

Composition

As of the 2020 redistricting, California's 51st congressional district is located in Southern California. It is almost entirely within the San Diego Metropolitan Area of San Diego County.

San Diego County is split between this district, the 50th district, the 48th district, and the 52nd district. The 51st and 48th are partitioned by Sabre Springs Openspace, Scripps Miramar Openspace, Beeler Canyon Rd, Sycamore Canyon Openspace, Weston Rd, Boulder Vis, Mast Blvd, West Hills Parkway, San Diego River, Highway 52, Simeon Dr, Mission Trails Openspace, Fanita Dr, Farmington Dr, Lund St, Nielsen St, Paseo de Los Castillos, Gillespie Air Field, Kenney St, San Vicente Freeway, Airport Dr, Wing Ave, W Bradley Ave, Vernon Way, Hart Dr, Greenfield Dr, E Bradley Ave, 830 Adele St-1789 N Mollison Ave, Peppervilla Dr/N Mollison Ave, Pepper Dr, Greta St/Cajon Greens Dr, N Mollison Ave/Buckey Dr, Denver Ln, Broadway Channel, N 2nd St, Flamingo Ave/Greenfield Dr, Dawnridge Ave/Cresthill Rd, Groveland Ter/Camillo Way, Sterling Dr, Kumeyaay Highway, E Madison Ave, Granite Hills Dr, E Lexington Ave, Dehesa Rd, Vista del Valle Blvd, Merritt Ter, E Washington Ave, Merritt Dr, Dewitt Ct, Emerald Heights Rd, Foote Path Way, Highway 8, Lemon Ave, Lake Helix Dr, La Cruz Dr, Carmichael Dr, Bancroft Dr, Campo Rd, and Sweetwater River.

The 51st and 50th are partitioned by Camino del Norte, Highway 15, Carmel Mountain Rd, Ted Williams Parkway, Del Mar Mesa Openspace, Los Penasquitos Creek, Inland Freeway, Governor Dr, Pavlov Ave, Stetson Ave, Millikin Ave, Regents Rd, Ducommun Ave, Bunch Ave, Branting St, Streseman St, Pennant Way, Highway 52, San Diego Freeway, Sea World Dr, Friars Rd, Kumeyaay Highway, and Highway 805.

The 51st and 52nd are partitioned by El Cajon Blvd, 58th St, Streamview Dr, College Ave, Meridian Ave, Lemarand Ave, Highway 94, Charlene Ave, 69th St, Imperial Ave, Larwood Rd, Taft St, Lincoln Pl, Glencoe Dr, Braddock St, Carlisle Dr, Carlsbad Ct/Osage Dr, Potrero St, Carlsbad St, Innsdale Ave, Worthington St/Innsdale Ln, Brady Ct/Innsdale Ln, Parkbrook Way/Alene St, Tinaja Ln/Bluffview Rd, Highway 54, Sweetwater Rd, and Bonita Rd.

The 51st district takes in the cities of El Cajon, Lemon Grove, La Mesa, and National City, as well as the census-designated place La Presa. It also encompasses the San Diego neighborhoods of Paradise Hills, Mira Mesa, Miramar, San Carlos, Sorrento, Clairemont, Normal Heights, Allied Gardens, Grantville, Balboa Park, Linda Vista, and Serra Mesa.

Cities & CDP with 10,000 or more people
 San Diego - 1,386,932
 El Cajon - 106,215
 La Mesa - 59,249
 La Presa - 37,410
 Lemon Grove - 27,627

List of members representing the district

Election results

1992

1994

1996

1998

2000

2002

2004

2006

2008

2010

2012

2014

2016

2018

2020

2022

Historical district boundaries
In the 1980s, California's 44th congressional district was one of four that divided San Diego. The district had been held for eight years by Democrat Jim Bates, and was considered the most Democratic district in the San Diego area. Randy "Duke" Cunningham won the Republican nomination and won the general election by just a point, meaning that the San Diego area was represented entirely by Republicans for only the second time since the city was split into three districts after the 1960 United States census.

After the 1990 United States census, the district was renumbered the 51st congressional district and much of its share of San Diego was moved to the new 50th congressional district.

See also

List of United States congressional districts

References

External links
District information at GovTrack.us

51
Government of Imperial County, California
Government of San Diego County, California
Government of San Diego
Imperial Valley
Mountain Empire (San Diego County)
South Bay (San Diego County)
Brawley, California
Calexico, California
Chula Vista, California
El Centro, California
National City, California
Constituencies established in 1993
1993 establishments in California